Oreophryne alticola is a species of frog in the family Microhylidae. It is endemic to West Papua, Indonesia, and only known from the vicinity of its type locality on the New Guinea Highlands. Its natural habitat is subalpine grassland at elevations of  asl. No significant threats to it are known.

References

alticola
Amphibians of Western New Guinea
Endemic fauna of New Guinea
Endemic fauna of Indonesia
Amphibians described in 2005
Taxa named by Stephen J. Richards
Taxa named by Richard G. Zweifel
Taxonomy articles created by Polbot